Senee Kaewnam (born September 5, 1986), or simply known as Say, is a Thai professional footballer who plays as a right back for Thai League 1 club Navy.

External links
 

1986 births
Living people
Senee Kaewnam
Senee Kaewnam
Association football defenders
Senee Kaewnam
Senee Kaewnam
Senee Kaewnam
Senee Kaewnam
Senee Kaewnam
Senee Kaewnam
Senee Kaewnam